William W. Borden High School is a high school located in Borden, Indiana.

See also
 List of high schools in Indiana
 Southern Athletic Conference of Indiana
 Borden, Indiana

References

External links
Official Website

Public high schools in Indiana
Schools in Clark County, Indiana
Buildings and structures in Clark County, Indiana